Min barndoms jul is a Charlotte Perrelli Christmas album, released on 20 November 2013. Perelli's sons Angelo and Alessio contribute to the album along with a choir consisting of 60 children.

Track listing
En barndomsjul
Bjällerklang (Jingle Bells)
Mössens julafton (Musevisa)
Nu tändas tusen juleljus
Hej mitt vinterland (solo by Angelo & Alessio)
Nu står jul vid snöig port
Jag såg mamma kyssa tomten (I Saw Mommy Kissing Santa Claus) (solo by Angelo)
När juldagsmorgon glimmar
Rudolf med röda mulen (Rudolph the Red-Nosed Reindeer)
Jul, jul, strålande jul
När det lider mot jul
Nu är julen här igen
Sista dagarna före jul
Julgransplundring (bonus track)

Charts

References

2013 Christmas albums
Charlotte Perrelli albums
Christmas albums by Swedish artists
Pop Christmas albums